Yarmouth Beach railway station was a railway station serving Great Yarmouth, Norfolk. It was opened in 1877 by the Great Yarmouth & Stalham Light Railway. In 1893 it was taken over by the Midland and Great Northern Joint Railway which had built a large network of track over East Anglia, initially conceived to transport holidaymakers from the Midlands to their destinations on the Norfolk coast. Acquiring Yarmouth Beach station fitted into this grand strategy. The line was also dependent on use by local travellers.

Use of the line gradually began to decline and by the 1950s competition from the roads diminished passenger numbers. Yarmouth Beach and the line it stood on closed in 1959 along with most of the Midland and Great Northern Joint Railway network, now in British Railways hands. Following closure, the site was used as a coach station and the station buildings were demolished in 1986. The site is now a coach and car park.

It lacked the direct routes of its rival at Yarmouth Vauxhall, instead taking a winding path across Norfolk without serving major towns.

References

External links
 Yarmouth Beach station on navigable 1946 O. S. map
 Yarmouth Beach station on 1887 O. S. map with current overlay
 Aerial photograph from 1926 by Aerofilms

Disused railway stations in Norfolk
Former Midland and Great Northern Joint Railway stations
Railway stations in Great Britain opened in 1877
Railway stations in Great Britain closed in 1959
Great Yarmouth